Trigon may refer to:

Games and puzzles
 Trigon (game), a ball game played by the ancient Romans
 Trigon (video game), a 1990 arcade game by Konami

Music
 Trigon (German band), a German-based fusion band
 Trigon (Moldovan band), a folk-jazz band from Moldova
 Trigon, a type of neume, an element of musical notation

Television
 Trigon (Titans episode)
 Trigon (Titans character)

Other uses
 Trigon (comics), a DC Comics character
 Trigon, a code name of Aleksandr Dmitrievich Ogorodnik, a Soviet diplomat who spied for the CIA
 Triangle, a polygon with three sides
  Trigon (Ditson), a 1970 public artwork by American artist Allen Ditson

See also
 Trigone (disambiguation)
 Trigun